The Bermudian FA Cup is the top knockout tournament for football in Bermuda. It was created in 1955 and is overseen by the Bermuda Football Association.

Winners

References

External links
Bermuda - List of Cup Winners, RSSSF.com

Football competitions in Bermuda
National association football cups
1955 establishments in Bermuda
Recurring sporting events established in 1955